Marisol González Casas (born 12 March 1983) is a Mexican television personality, actress, and beauty pageant titleholder who competed in the Miss Universe 2003 pageant, held in Panama City, Panama on 3 June 2003.

Career
After winning the title of Nuestra Belleza México 2002, González competed in Miss Universe 2003.  She is a sports reporter for Televisa Deportes and made her debut as an actress in 2005 on the telenovela Contra viento y marea with Danna Paola.

Personal life
González was engaged to Canelo Álvarez, the Mexican boxing world champion, from 2010 to 2012.

References

External links

1983 births
Living people
Mexican beauty pageant winners
Mexican television actresses
Mexican television personalities
Miss Universe 2003 contestants
Nuestra Belleza México winners
People from Torreón